Allegheny Airlines was a regional airline that operated out of Pittsburgh, Pennsylvania, from 1952 to 1979 with routes primarily located in the eastern U.S. It was the forerunner of USAir that was subsequently renamed US Airways, which itself merged with American Airlines. Its headquarters were at Washington National Airport in Arlington County, Virginia.

History
Allegheny Airlines began as All American Aviation Company providing mail delivery starting on 7 March 1939. It was founded by du Pont family brothers Richard C. du Pont and Alexis Felix du Pont Jr.

Allegheny before 1979

In 1949 the company was renamed All American Airways as it switched from air mail to passenger service. On 1 January 1953 it was again renamed, to Allegheny Airlines. Like other local service airlines, Allegheny was subsidized; in 1962 its revenue of $23.5 million included $6.5 million in "public service revenue".

In 1960, Allegheny headquarters were in Washington, D.C.

In 1953 Allegheny's network blanketed Pennsylvania, reaching Newark NJ to Cleveland and Huntington WV. It added Detroit (YIP) in 1956, Boston in April 1960, La Guardia in 1964, Norfolk in 1966, Toronto in 1967, and Louisville-Nashville-Memphis in 1968. The Lake Central Airlines merger in July 1968 added Chicago and St Louis, and the Mohawk Airlines merger in April 1972 added Montreal, Minneapolis and many New York cities. Houston in 1978, then Florida at the end of 1978 (TPA-MCO-PBI) and Phoenix in 1979.

In 1959 Allegheny debuted its first turbine airliner—a Convair 540, a Convair 340 with the piston engines replaced by Napier Elands. When Rolls-Royce bought Napier it dropped the Eland, so 540s in the United States reverted to piston; Allegheny's last 540 flights were in 1962. The airline bought new Fairchild F-27Js that the company named "Vistaliner". The F-27J was a U.S.-built version of the Fokker F27. The airline switched to General Motors/Allison turboprops in the Convair 580 which the carrier named the "Vistacruiser", the first CV580 flight was in June 1965. The last DC-3 flights were in 1962 and the last piston flights were in 1967.

In 1965 Allegheny announced it would add the first jet aircraft type to its fleet—the Douglas DC-9-10—which the airline stated would be placed into service in 1966.  Allegheny then added other jets, notably the McDonnell Douglas DC-9-30 which the company named the "Vistajet". Later jets included Boeing 727-100s, 727-200s and McDonnell Douglas DC-9-50s. The Mohawk merger added British Aircraft Corporation BAC One-Eleven jets to the fleet as well.  Allegheny Airlines was also the first airline with a network of affiliated regional airlines, the Allegheny Commuter system, which began with Henson Airlines in 1967.

As deregulation dawned, Allegheny, looking to shed its regional image, changed its name to USAir on October 28, 1979.

USAir and US Airways
After Allegheny Airlines rebranded itself as USAir, the company retained its earlier name for its Allegheny Commuter service until 1989 when it became US Airways Express.

Under USAir, which eventually renamed itself US Airways, the Allegheny name continued to be used by the parent company, keeping the trademark under US Airways' control. Suburban Airlines was originally headquartered at the Reading Airport in Reading, Pennsylvania, and flew a large fleet of Short 330s and Short 360s, being the launch customer for the Short 360. It had three Fokker F27s, and was the last US operator of passenger F27s. After replacing much of its Short fleet with de Havilland Canada DHC-8 Dash 8s and retiring the F27s, Suburban merged with another wholly owned USAir subsidiary, Pennsylvania Airlines, which was headquartered at Harrisburg International Airport near Harrisburg, Pennsylvania. The combined airline retained the historic Allegheny Airlines name until it was merged with another wholly owned subsidiary, Piedmont Airlines. The subsequent airline retained the Piedmont Airlines name. After retiring earlier aircraft, Allegheny, before and after its mergers, mainly flew De Havilland Canada Dash 8s to 35 airports in the northeastern United States, and eventually Canada, from hubs at Boston and Philadelphia. Its activities and Dash 8 fleet were incorporated into a regional airline, Piedmont Airlines, in 2004.

 an American Airlines Airbus A319, registered N745VJ, is painted in Allegheny colors. US Airways also operated this aircraft with a retro Allegheny Airlines paint scheme.

Destinations
This is a list of cities served by Allegheny Airlines until October 1979. It does not include destinations served before that year. Allegheny flew to dozens more cities at some point, including Erie, Providence and the Wyoming Valley.

Allegheny Airlines

Akron, Ohio - Akron–Canton Airport
Albany, New York – Albany County Airport
Allentown, Pennsylvania – Allentown-Bethlehem-Easton International Airport
Baltimore, Maryland – Baltimore–Washington International Airport
Binghamton, New York – Broome County Airport
Boston, Massachusetts – Logan International Airport
Bradford, Pennsylvania – Bradford Regional Airport
Bridgeport, Connecticut – Igor I. Sikorsky Memorial Airport
Buffalo, New York – Greater Buffalo-Niagara Falls International Airport
Burlington, Vermont – Burlington International Airport
Chicago, Illinois – O'Hare International Airport
Cincinnati, Ohio – Greater Cincinnati International Airport
Cleveland, Ohio – Hopkins International Airport
Columbus, Ohio – Port Columbus International Airport
Dayton, Ohio – James M. Cox International Airport
Denver, Colorado – Stapleton International Airport
Detroit, Michigan – Metro Airport
DuBois, Pennsylvania – DuBois-Jefferson County Airport
Elmira, New York – Chemung County Airport
Erie, Pennsylvania – Erie International Airport
Evansville, Indiana – Evansville Regional Airport
Glens Falls, New York – Warren County Airport
Hagerstown, Maryland – Hagerstown Regional Airport
Harrisburg, Pennsylvania – Harrisburg International Airport
Hartford, Connecticut – Bradley International Airport
Huntington, West Virginia -Tri-State Airport
Indianapolis, Indiana – Weir Cook Airport
Islip, New York – Islip Airport
Ithaca, New York – Tompkins County Airport
Jamestown, New York – Chautauqua County-Jamestown Airport
Keene, New Hampshire – Dillant–Hopkins Airport
Kingsport, Tennessee – Tri-Cities Regional Airport
Lawrenceville, Illinois - Lawrenceville-Vincennes International Airport
Lima, Ohio – Lima Allen County Airport
Lock Haven, Pennsylvania – William T. Piper Memorial Airport
Louisville, Kentucky – Standiford Field
Mansfield, Ohio – Mansfield Lahm Regional Airport
Memphis, Tennessee – Memphis International Airport
Minneapolis-St. Paul, Minnesota – Minneapolis-St. Paul International Airport
Nashville, Tennessee – Berry Field
Newark, New Jersey – Newark International Airport
New Haven, Connecticut – Tweed New Haven Airport
New Orleans, Louisiana – Moisant Field
New York, New York – John F. Kennedy International Airport
New York, New York – LaGuardia Airport
Norfolk, Virginia - Norfolk International Airport
Omaha, Nebraska – Eppley Airfield
Parkersburg, West Virginia – Wood County Airport
Philadelphia, Pennsylvania – Philadelphia International Airport
Phoenix, Arizona – Sky Harbor International Airport
Pittsburgh, Pennsylvania – Greater Pittsburgh International Airport
Portsmouth, Ohio - Greater Portsmouth Regional Airport
Providence, Rhode Island – Theodore Francis Green State Airport
Rochester, New York – Greater Rochester International Airport
St. Louis, Missouri – Lambert Field
Syracuse, New York – Hancock International Airport
Toledo, Ohio – Toledo Express Airport
Trenton, New Jersey – Mercer County Airport
Utica, New York – Oneida County Airport
Youngstown, Ohio – Youngstown–Warren Regional Airport
Washington, District of Columbia – Washington National Airport
Wheeling, West Virginia - Wheeling Ohio County Airport
Wilkes Barre, Pennsylvania – Wilkes-Barre/Scranton International Airport
Williamsport, Pennsylvania – Williamsport Regional Airport
Wilmington, Delaware – New Castle Airport
Worcester, Massachusetts – Worcester Regional Airport
York, Pennsylvania – Olmstead State Airport
Zanesville, Ohio – Zanesville Municipal Airport

Canada
Montreal, Quebec – Montreal International Airport
Toronto, Ontario – Toronto International Airport

Allegheny commuter 

Albany, New York – Albany County Airport
Allentown, Pennsylvania – Lehigh Valley International Airport
Altoona, Pennsylvania – Altoona–Blair County Airport
Atlantic City, New Jersey – Bader Field
Bloomington, Indiana – Monroe County Airport
Boston, Massachusetts – Logan International Airport
Burlington, Vermont – Burlington International Airport
Charleston, West Virginia – Kanawha Airport
Clarksburg, West Virginia – North Central West Virginia Airport
Cleveland, Ohio – Cleveland Hopkins International Airport
Danville, Illinois – Vermilion Regional Airport
Dubois, Pennsylvania – DuBois Regional Airport
Elkins, West Virginia – Elkins Randolph County Airport
Franklin, Pennsylvania – Chess Lamberton Field
Galion, Ohio – Galion Municipal Airport
Glens Falls, New York – Warren County Airport
Hagerstown, Maryland – Hagerstown Regional Airport
Harrisburg, Pennsylvania – Harrisburg International Airport
Hartford, Connecticut – Bradley International Airport
Hazleton, Pennsylvania – Hazleton Municipal Airport
Islip, New York – Long Island MacArthur Airport
Johnstown, Pennsylvania – Cambria County Airport
Lafayette, Indiana – Purdue University Airport
Lancaster, Pennsylvania – Lancaster Airport
Lynchburg, Virginia – Preston Glenn Field
Manchester, New Hampshire – Manchester-Boston Regional Airport
Mansfield, Ohio – Mansfield Municipal Airport
Massena, New York – Richards Field
Millville, New Jersey – Millville Airport
Morgantown, West Virginia – Walter L. Hart Field
Muncie, Indiana – Johnson Field
Newark, New Jersey – Newark Liberty International Airport
New London, Connecticut – Trumbull Airport
New York, New York – JFK Airport and La Guardia Airport
North Philadelphia, Pennsylvania – Northeast Philadelphia Airport
Ocala, Florida – Ocala International Airport
Ogdensburg, New York – Ogdensburg International Airport
Plattsburgh, New York – Plattsburgh Airport
Pittsburgh, Pennsylvania – Greater Pittsburgh International Airport
Portland, Maine – Portland International Jetport
Providence, Rhode Island – T.F. Green Airport
Reading, Pennsylvania – General Spaatz Airport
Rutland, Vermont – Rutland State Airport
Salisbury, Maryland – Wicomico Regional Airport
Saranac Lake, New York – Saranac Lake Airport
State College, Pennsylvania -Mid State Airport
Syracuse, New York – Syracuse Hancock International Airport
Terre Haute, Indiana – Hulman Field
Trenton, New Jersey – Mercer County Airport
Watertown, New York – Watertown Airport
Wildwood/Cape May, New Jersey – Cape May County Airport
Wilkes-Barre/Scranton, Pennsylvania – Wilkes-Barre/Scranton International Airport

Historic fleet

Allegheny also briefly operated Douglas DC-9-10 aircraft.

Accidents and incidents
 On November 14, 1955, an Allegheny Airlines Martin 2-0-2 was undertaking training flights at Wilmington Airport in New Castle County, Delaware, when the No. 1 engine caught fire during a single engine approach. On landing, the left main landing gear collapsed, and the aircraft was withdrawn from service and used for spare parts.
 On December 1, 1959, Allegheny Airlines Flight 371, a Martin 2-0-2, crashed into a mountain on approach to Williamsport, Pennsylvania, United States. There were 25 fatalities.
 On October 19, 1962, an Allegheny Airlines flight attendant, Françoise de Moriere, fell to her death after being blown out a Convair 440 emergency exit door on a flight from Washington, D.C., to Providence, Rhode Island, during a scheduled descent into Hartford, Connecticut. This incident inspired James Dickey's poem "Falling".
 On November 2, 1963, an Allegheny Airlines Martin 2-0-2 was damaged beyond repair under unknown circumstances while taxiing at Newark International Airport.
 On July 23, 1965, Allegheny Airlines Flight 604 crashed northeast of the Williamsport Regional Airport due to a right engine failure and subsequent failure to follow engine out procedures by the flight crew. None of the 40 occupants on board were killed, but 23 were injured.
 On November 29, 1966, Allegheny Airlines Flight 305, operated by a Convair 440, suffered a complete electrical failure on takeoff from Capital City Airport in Harrisburg, Pennsylvania. The pilots attempted to abort the takeoff, but the reversers did not work, and the aircraft overran the runway, striking an approach light tower. The cause of the failure was later determined to be an improperly installed heater.
 On December 24, 1968, Allegheny Airlines Flight 736, a Convair 580, crashed on approach to Bradford, Pennsylvania, killing 20 of the 47 people on board.
 On January 6, 1969, Allegheny Airlines Flight 737, a Convair 580, also crashed on approach to Bradford, Pennsylvania, killing 11 of the 28 people on board.
 On September 9, 1969, Allegheny Airlines Flight 853, a DC-9 en route from Cincinnati  to Indianapolis, collided with a small private plane and crashed into a soybean field southeast of Indianapolis, near Shelbyville, Indiana, killing all 83 people aboard both aircraft.
 On June 7, 1971, Allegheny Airlines Flight 485, a Convair 580, en route from Washington, D.C., to New Haven, Connecticut (via New London, Connecticut) crashed short of the runway at New Haven. 26 passengers and two crew members were killed; two passengers and one crew member survived. Pilot error was the cause of the crash.
 On June 23, 1976, Allegheny Airlines Flight 121, a DC-9, crashed on the runway due to windshear at Philadelphia International Airport. There were 86 injuries and no fatalities.
 On July 9, 1978, Allegheny Airlines Flight 453 crash-landed at Greater Rochester International Airport while arriving from Boston Logan International Airport. The BAC-111 aircraft was carrying 77 people, and there was one serious injury.

See also 
Air transportation in the United States
List of defunct airlines of the United States

Notes

References

External links

Timetableimages.com has timetables from the 1950s and 1960s showing where Allegheny flew and what it cost
 Allegheny Airlines Flight 853 memorial website by Dan McGlaun on the September 9, 1969, crash near Indianapolis

 
Airlines established in 1952
Airlines disestablished in 1979
Companies based in Pittsburgh
Defunct airlines of the United States
Defunct companies based in Pennsylvania
US Airways Group
American companies established in 1952
Defunct regional airlines of the United States
Airlines based in Pennsylvania